KOFA (1320 AM) is a public radio station airing a wide variety of music programs, along with a few news and talk programs. Licensed to Yuma, Arizona, United States, the station serves the Yuma area. The station is currently owned by Arizona Western College and features programming from National Public Radio and Public Radio International.

History

1320 AM began life as the original KBLU, signing on September 6, 1959. When Eller Telecasting and Combined Communications merged in 1969, the newly formed group had to divest one of KBLU or KYUM at 560, choosing to keep the latter and donate the former to Arizona Western College. On January 1, 1970, the donation took effect, and 1320 AM signed off with the callsign changing to KAWC; 560 AM changed to KBLU.

Arizona Western College immediately relocated the transmitter to its campus and instituted a public radio format, which signed on for the first time on July 11, 1970.

In 2009, the K-Jazz Radio Network with its transmitters in northwestern and northern Arizona entered into agreement with Colorado River Public Media, by which those transmitters simulcast 1320 AM on weekdays.

The station changed its callsign to the current KOFA on July 13, 2017.

References

External links

OFA (AM)
OFA (AM)
NPR member stations
Radio stations established in 1959
1959 establishments in Arizona
Arizona Western College
Full service radio stations in the United States